Maravalia is a genus of rust fungi in the Chaconiaceae family. The widespread genus contains about 35 species that grow on angiosperms.

Species
Maravalia africana
Maravalia allophyli
Maravalia amazonensis
Maravalia aulica
Maravalia bauhiniicola
Maravalia bolivarensis
Maravalia crotalariae
Maravalia cryptostegiae
Maravalia echinulata
Maravalia erythroxyli
Maravalia exigua
Maravalia fici
Maravalia fusiformis
Maravalia gentilis
Maravalia guianensis
Maravalia lonchocarpi
Maravalia lucumae
Maravalia milletticola
Maravalia mimusops
Maravalia palaquii
Maravalia pallida
Maravalia payenae
Maravalia pseudosuprastomatalis
Maravalia quadrilobata
Maravalia sapotae
Maravalia swartziae

References

External links

Pucciniales